= Pseudosetipinna =

Scientific classification
- Kingdom: Animalia
- Phylum: Chordata
- Class: Actinopterygii
- Order: Clupeiformes
- Family: Engraulidae
- Subfamily: Coiliinae
- Genus: Pseudosetipinna; Y. B. Peng & Z. R. Zhao, 1988
- Species: P. haizhouensis

Binomial name
- Pseudosetipinna haizhouensis Y. B. Peng & Z. R. Zhao, 1988

Genus of ray-finned fishes

Pseudosetipinna haizhouensis is a species of anchovy found in the waters around China. It is the only species in its genus.
